Qishi is a town under the jurisdiction of Dongguan prefecture-level city in Guangdong province, China.

Economy
Qishi's economy has expanded enormously with many new factories in Qishi. There is even a government certified 5 star hotel in Qishi. The town's GDP was estimated at 2.67 billion Renminbi and the largest industries include electronics, computers, hardware, printing, stationery, and furniture.

References

Geography of Dongguan
Towns in Guangdong